Antoine Penchenier, or Penchinier, (? , Montélimar – 1761, Donzère), was an 18th-century French physician.

Biography 
Born in Montélimar, he studied medicine in Montpellier where he held a practise. Penchenier wrote  the article Goutte (gout)  for volume VII of the Encyclopédie by Diderot and D'Alembert, in which he denounced in the same time charlatans and their powders of orvietan.

After his death, his widow, Delphine Rapin, married Vincent-Amable de Roqueplane, baron de Lestrade, from Montélimar

References

Bibliography 
 Frank Arthur Kafker, The encyclopedists as individuals: a biographical dictionary of the authors of the Encyclopédie, Oxford, Studies on Voltaire and the eighteenth Century, 1988, p. 295-6.

External links 
 Antoine Penchenier on Wikisource
 Natale Gaspare De Santo; Massimo Cirillo; Carmela Bisaccia; Gabriel Richet; Garabed Eknoyan: Nephrological Excerpts From the Encyclopédie of Diderot and d’Alembert. In: Am J Kidney Dis. 2011;57:788-798 (PDF; 2,09 MB)

18th-century French physicians
Contributors to the Encyclopédie (1751–1772)
People from Montélimar
1761 deaths